Model 8 may refer to:

Aviation
 Bell Model 8 Airacuda, a heavy fighter aircraft
 Boeing Model 8, a biplane aircraft
 Consolidated Model 8, an observation and training airplane
 Convair Model 8, a jet fighter family
 Curtiss Model 8 (HS-1), a flying boat
 Fleet Model 8, a biplane airplane
 Fokker Model 8 Super Universal, a prop-driven airliner
 Lockheed Model 8 Sirius, prop-driven monoplane aircraft
 Luscombe Model 8 Silvaire, high-wing general aviation aeroplane

Weapons
 Model 08 Semi-Automatic Pistol 0.3 Inch, a German WWII service pistol
 Remington Model 8, semiautomatic rifle
 Walther Model 8, single-action pistol

Other uses
 Renault Model 8, a road car

See also

 
 Model (disambiguation)
 8 (disambiguation)
 M8 (disambiguation)